Edward Daniel Kusel (February 15, 1886 – October 20, 1948) was an American Major League Baseball pitcher who played for the St. Louis Browns in .

External links
Baseball Reference.com

1886 births
1948 deaths
St. Louis Browns players
Major League Baseball pitchers
Baseball players from Ohio
Saginaw Wa-was players